Epicrisias is a monotypic moth genus in the family Erebidae. Its only species, Epicrisias eschara, is found in Mexico. Both the genus and species were first described by Harrison Gray Dyar Jr. in 1912.

References

Phaegopterina
Monotypic moth genera
Moths of Central America